"Living Loving Maid (She's Just a Woman)" is a song by English rock band Led Zeppelin from their album Led Zeppelin II, released in 1969. It was also released as a single in Japan and as the B-side of the single "Whole Lotta Love" in the United States.

The song is about a groupie who stalked the band early in their career. It is guitarist Jimmy Page's least favourite Led Zeppelin song and thus was never performed in concert. However, the song did reach the charts in the US (Hot 100 ) and Japan (Oricon ).

This song immediately follows "Heartbreaker" on side 2 of Led Zeppelin II and radio stations have traditionally played them together in succession.

See also
List of cover versions of Led Zeppelin songs"Living Loving Maid" entries

References

External links

Led Zeppelin songs
Songs written by Jimmy Page
Songs written by Robert Plant
1969 songs
Song recordings produced by Jimmy Page
Atlantic Records singles
1969 singles